Theodor Franz Jörgensmann (born 29 September 1948) is a German jazz clarinetist.

Activities

Theo Jörgensmann belongs to the second generation of European free jazz musicians. He was part of the clarinet renaissance in the jazz and improvising music scene. Jörgensmann is one of a few clarinet players for whom unaccompanied solo recordings are a significant part of his work.

He started to play clarinet when he was 18 years old. From 1969 until 1972 Jörgensmann took private lessons from a music teacher at the Folkwang Hochschule in Essen. At the same time he started working with fellow musicians from the Ruhr industrial area. During this time he was also a chemical laboratory assistant. After a one and half year hitch in the German Army Jörgensmann worked with handicapped children and studied social pedagogics, but he never brought it to a conclusion. Since 1975 he has been a professional musician.

During a career spanning three decades as a free improviser Jörgensmann has worked with (among many others) Mike Richmond, Barre Phillips, Kent Carter, John Lindberg, Charlie Mariano, Wilber Morris, Eric Vloeimans, Jeanne Lee, John Fischer, Vincent Chancey, Kenny Wheeler, Paul McCandless and Lee Konitz.

From 1975 to 1977 he led the group Clarinet Contrast, consisting only of clarinets, with Perry Robinson, Hans Kumpf, Bernd Konrad and Michel Pilz. At the end of the 1970s he was leader of one of West Germany's best-known jazz groups. At the beginning of the 1980s he took part in a Clarinet Summit (which was created by Joachim E. Berendt and himself) with John Carter, Perry Robinson, Gianluigi Trovesi and others. Since those days Jörgensmann has been involved in numerous international projects. In 1985 Jörgensmann toured Europe with bassist Barre Phillips and reed player Paul McCandless. He was a member of Willem van Manen's Contraband (1985–1998), Andrea Centazzo's Mitteleuropa Orchestra (1983–1985), John Fischer's Interface (1981–1996) and Franz Koglmann's Pipetet (1983–1985). At the same time he was also leader of Klarinettenquartett Cl-4 and co-founder of large ensemble Grubenklangorchester. In 1987 Jörgensmann was the subject of a documentary film, Theo Jörgensmann, Bottrop, Klarinette, directed by Christoph Hübner.

Between 1983 and 1993 he held a lectureship for clarinet and ensemble at University of Duisburg, and from 1993 until 1997 he was a lecturer for free improvising at Music Therapeutics Institute of Witten/Herdecke University. In company with the music-scientist Rolf-Dieter Weyer, Jörgensmann wrote a philosophical book about improvising in music.

In 1997 he started the Theo Jörgensmann Quartet, which toured in North America in 1999, 2001, and 2003, including playing twice at Montreal International Jazz Festival (1999 and 2003). In addition he has played with the Polish twins Marcin Oles and Bartlomiej Oles since 2003. The album Oleś Jörgensmann Oleś, Directions, was chosen by [Polish internet jazz magazine Diapazon as  Record of the Year in 2005.

Since 2008 he is a member of Trio Hot with Albrecht Maurer, violin and Peter Jacquemyn, bass, and in 2009 he started the Deep Down Clarinet Duo with the contrabass clarinet player Ernst Ulrich Deuker. They also work together in the Tribal Trio, a clarinet trio with the French-American clarinetist Etienne Rolin. In 2009 Jörgensmann performed a few concerts with younger musicians from UK (Seb Rochford, Dominic Lash, Shabaka Hutchings and Noel Taylor) in London. In 2011 he formed the Freedom Trio with bassist Christian Sydney Ramond and acoustic guitar player Hagen Stüdemann. After a twelve-year break, he also works together again with pianist Bernd Köppen. Currently Jorgensmann is also working again with Clarinet Summit. The members of the group are Perry Robinson, Gianluigi Trovesi, Bernd Konrad, Albrecht Maurer, Sebastian Gramss and Günther "Baby" Sommer. In 2018, Jörgensmann was artist in residence at Singers Festival Warsaw, the biggest festival of Jewish culture in Poland.

Discography

As leader
 In Time (A&M, 1977)
 Straightout! (Europhon, 1978)
 Live at Birdland Gelsenkirchen (Europhon, 1978)
 Go Ahead Clarinet (CMP, 1978)
 Song of BoWaGe (CMP, 1979)
 You Better Fly Away with Clarinet Summit (MPS, 1980)
 Next Adventure (CMP, 1981)
 Deep Blue Lake with John Fischer (ReEntry, 1984)
 Zeitverdichtung (Konnex, 1986)
 Fur Den Letzten Gast with Bernd Koppen (Senti, 1986)
 Tauwetter (Kip, 1989)
 Introitus with Hans-Gunther Wauer (Kip, 1990)
 Live at Music Academy with Federico Sanesi (BMM, 1993)
 Aesthetic Direction (Konnex, 1994)
 Merseburger Begegnung with Hans-Gunther Wauer (Kip, 1994)
 Swiss Radio Days Volume Three with John Fischer (ReEntry, 1994)
 Ta Eko Mo (Z.o.o., 1997)
 So I Play (Kip, 1997)
 Snijbloemen (hatOLOGY, 2000)
 Pagine Gialle with Eckard Koltermann (hatOLOGY, 2001)
 To Ornette - Hybrid Identity (hatOLOGY, 2002)
 Fellowship (hatOLOGY, 2005)
 Alchemia with Oles Brothers (hatOLOGY, 2007)
 New Conception of Duo Hagen Studemann (Konnex, 2010)
 Melencolia with Albrecht Maurer (Nemu, 2011)
 Blue in Blue with Karoly Binder (BMM, 2011)
 Bucksch (Konnex, 2014)
 Elements in Candor with Krzysztof Dys, Michael Marcus (For Tune, 2016)

Selected compositions 
Snijbloemen  a composition for clarinet, vibes, bass and percussion. (2000) Recorded Hat-Hut records hatOLOGY 539
Die Eroberung des Schönen an experimental opera for 3 writers, 1 actor, 1 painter and 1 musician. (1995) WDR-Tv production.
Der Garten  a dance-theater-piece for 2 dancers, clarinet, bass clarinet, sound-maschine and percussion. (1994) Choreography: Claudia Lichtblau. Composition: Theo Jörgensmann/Eckard Koltermann
Hommage á Béla Bartók chamber music for violin, clarinet, bass clarinet and contra bass. (1994)
Aesthetic direction chamber music for  violin, violoncello, clarinet, bass clarinet and percussion (1993)

Theory
Jörgensmann wrote in his book Kleine Ethik der Improvisation:
"To find the right balance between communication of motion and non-communication is the major part of improvised music; that communication of motion as a part of interaction in music is an opportunity to create a new structure of time, which the listener could perceive as a new kind of musical space;  that the idea of jazz does not depend on a specific material and special form; that the essential aspect of jazz is the fact that jazz musicians discovered the fourth dimension of time in music (they call it swing)."

Publications 
 Kleine Ethik der Improvisation: vom Wesen, Zeit und Raum, Material und Spontangestalt, by Theo Jörgensmann & Rolf-Dieter Weyer, with silhouettes  of Hermann "Es" Richter

Awards 
 Kunstförderpreis der Stadt Aachen 1980
 Kulturpreis der Stadt Bottrop 1991
 Jazzpreis des Ruhrgebiets - Jazz Pott 2018

References

 Die Klarinette documentary film, NDR-tv (1987)
 Der Monolog a film by Reinald Schnell; WDR-tv  production (1990)
 Wagner Bilder a film and video-installation with a.o. Bochumer Symphoniker, Christoph Schlingensief; colour, 72 min. director: Christoph Hübner  (2001/2002)

External links
 
 Interview at All About Jazz
 Theo Jörgensmann Quartet

Avant-garde jazz clarinetists
Free jazz clarinetists
Modal jazz clarinetists
Free improvisation clarinetists
German jazz clarinetists
German jazz composers
Male jazz composers
German male composers
German composers
People from the Province of Westphalia
People from Bottrop
1948 births
Living people
21st-century clarinetists
21st-century German male musicians
Klarinettenquartett Cl-4 members
Clarinet Contrast members